Bass Quarterly is a major German-based music magazine for bass players. The magazine was established in 2008. The publishers are  PNP-Verlag and Media4Music. The headquarters of the magazines is in Neumarkt in der Oberpfalz. It centres its issues around technical news, electrics, reviews, vintage guitars and interviews with musicians.

World renowned bass players have been interviewed, as Bill Wyman (The Rolling Stones), Linley Marthe (Joe Zawinul), Felix Pastorius, Romain Labaye (Scott Henderson), Geddy Lee (Rush), Gabriel Severn, Robert Trujillo (Metallica) and many others...

References

External links
 Official website

2008 establishments in Germany
Music magazines published in Germany
German-language magazines
Guitar magazines
Magazines established in 2008
Quarterly magazines published in Germany